Brutally Mutilated is a 7-inch vinyl EP by the death metal band Mortician. It was recorded prior to the band's involvement with Relapse Records Only 1000 copies of the EP were pressed.

The tracks from Brutally Mutilated, along with the tracks from Mortician's Mortal Massacre 7-inch EP were later re-issued by Relapse Records on the Mortal Massacre cd.

Track listing

Personnel
Will Rahmer — Bass and Vocals
John McEntee — Guitar
Matt Sicher — Drums

Mortician (band) albums
1990 EPs